Killursa is a medieval church and National Monument in County Galway, Ireland. 
The church is located on the outskirts of Westport, about east-northeast of the town of Galway. It has a rectangular mass in the Early Christian or Romanesque style, with an octagonal tower at its northeast corner. The tower was apparently added in the 15th century. The church is datable from the 12th century, and may have been founded by St. Columba. The current structure is from the 16th century.

The church is notable for the pre-Reformation frescoes, which are some of the best in Ireland. These include a depiction of the Crucifixion, and other scenes from the Life of Christ. The paintings are attributed to the Master of Ballina, who is traditionally thought to have been active in the mid-14th century. The frescoes were damaged by dampness in the 18th century, and were restored in the 1990s.

Location

History

A monastery was established here in the 7th century by Saint Fursey (Fursa).

The church on the current site dates from the 12th or 13th century, although the southwestern part is thought to be even older. It fell out of use around the 15th century.

Description

The church is rectangular with mullioned Late Gothic window and trabeate doorway.

References

Religion in County Galway
Archaeological sites in County Galway
National Monuments in County Galway
Former churches in the Republic of Ireland